Daphnomancy is a form of pyromancy whereby the future is predicted by burning bay laurel leaves. A loud crackling from the fire is a positive omen, whereas silence is a negative one.

History and etymology
Daphno is thought to be a tribute to Daphne, an ancient Greek nymph turned into the first laurel tree by Apollo. Originally, the leaves were selected from the sacred grove of Apollo, but as time moved on the practice of daphnomancy spread to pre-Christian era Rome and Greece and was thought to be commonly practiced by augurs of both empires.

The original grove from which the Romans took their laurel branches withered in 68 AD, which contemporary augurs associated with Nero's death.

References

Divination